Coronation was a 90-gun second-rate ship of the line of the English Royal Navy, built at Portsmouth Dockyard as part of the '30 great ships programme' of 1677, and launched in 1685. She was lost in a storm off Rame Head, Cornwall on 3 September 1691 and is designated under the Protection of Wrecks Act 1973. The wreck is a Protected Wreck managed by Historic England.

Service
Coronation was commissioned on 14 February 1690 under Captain John Munden, as the flagship of Vice-Admiral Sir Ralph Delavall, under whom she took part in the Battle of Beachy Head, against the French, on 30 June 1690. The French won the battle and had temporary control of the English Channel. Captain Charles Skelton took command of the ship on 29 October 1690.

Loss
On 3 September 1691 Coronation was patrolling the channel with the English Fleet and made for Plymouth. The exact circumstances are unclear but it is thought she dragged her anchors while trying to sit out a south-east gale in the lee of Rame Head and was driven aground in Lady Cove to the west of Penlee Point; approximately 600 men drowned, including Skelton. Only about twenty survived.

Wreck
Part of the wreck was discovered, close to the shore in 1967 and a second offshore site was found in 1977. The area is subject to strong tidal flows, especially during spring tides. The main wreck site extends in a south-west direction, over 1300m, from the southern side of Penlee Point and artefacts are spread over a large area. The site is a protected wreck and a licence is required to dive on the site.

References
Notes

Bibliography

Lavery, Brian (2003) The Ship of the Line – Volume 1: The development of the battlefleet 1650–1850. Conway Maritime Press. .
Winfield, Rif (2009) British Warships in the Age of Sail: 1603–1714. Seaforth Publishing.

External links 

 "Coronation Offshore site" National Heritage List for England
 "Coronation Inshore site" National Heritage List for England

1680s ships
Cornish shipwrecks
Protected Wrecks of England
Ships of the line of the Royal Navy
Wreck diving sites in England